"Crushcrushcrush" (stylized in all lowercase) is a song by American rock band Paramore, and is the third single from the group's second studio album, Riot!. The official music video premiered on TRL on October 16, 2007.
The single was released in late 2007. It was made available in the United Kingdom for download from November 5 and purchase on November 26, 2007. The single is also playable on various music video games such as Rock Band, Rock Band Unplugged, Guitar Hero On Tour: Decades, and Ultimate Band. The single won a Teen Choice Award for "Choice Rock Track". It was also used briefly in NCIS, in the episode "Stakeout". On March 24, 2016, the song was certified Platinum in the United States for selling over 1,000,000 copies.

Reception
Alex Fletcher at Digital Spy described the song as having "Juicy riffs, a humongous chorus, a cheesy breakdown." Fletcher also commented on the song being more Kelly Clarkson and Avril Lavigne than Metallica. It is observed as a very catchy song at BBC News Online, whom stated "The further into it you get, the better it becomes with some brilliant and energetic guitars joining in." Ed Masley at The Arizona Republic ranked it as the 12th best Paramore song, stating "As for the crushes in the title, they're whispered in a voice that may be best described as sinister. And the guitar licks seal the deal." Jerry Holkins, however, remarked, "The lyrics are beyond incoherent, a dreadlock of oily nonsense that is either the result of schizophrenia, multiple authorship, or collated from multiple failed songs and compressed into some tar lozenge of epic failure."

In 2017, NME ranked the song number five on their list of the 10 greatest Paramore songs, and in 2021, Kerrang ranked the song number one on their list of the 20 greatest Paramore songs.

Music video
The music video shows the band performing in a barren desert environment, and three people spying on them with binoculars from a distance. The three voyeurs watch from behind various old trinkets that have formed a faux house without walls or a roof. Intercut between Paramore's performance of the song are clips of the band walking through the voyeur's "house" and later on, short clips show that Paramore and the bandits watching them are the same (Hayley Williams in the bathtub, John Janick and Jeremy Davis playing and slamming their guitars and Zac Farro pushing his stands over and throwing drums). The video was directed by Shane Drake.

Davis stated in an interview with Kerrang! that the group was not able to fully finish the video and some shots were just repeated because of a large sandstorm which set in a few hours into recording the video. The video was also nominated for a Best Rock Video at the 2008 MTV Video Music Awards, but lost to Linkin Park's "Shadow of the Day".

As of May 2022, the song has 165 million views on YouTube.

Single release
The single is available in 3 formats. In addition to "Crushcrushcrush", certain vinyl releases feature live versions of "Misery Business" and "For a Pessimist, I'm Pretty Optimistic" from Paramore's album, Riot!

Track listings

Charts

Weekly charts

Year-end charts

Certifications

References

Paramore songs
2007 songs
2008 singles
Atlantic Records singles
Fueled by Ramen singles
Music videos directed by Shane Drake
Song recordings produced by David Bendeth
Songs written by Hayley Williams
Songs written by Josh Farro